"Von der Skyline zum Bordstein zurück" (German: "From the skyline back to the curb") is the title track and first single by German rapper Bushido from his album Von der Skyline zum Bordstein zurück.

The song is based on "Vom Bordstein bis zur Skyline" from the album of the same title. The hook has the same lyrics. The song contains a sample from the song "Terminal" by the band Antimatter.

The single was one of the most successful hip hop singles in Germany; it reached place 14 in the charts.

Music video
The music video shows scenes where people are frozen still, as if time suddenly stops. Bushido is the only person who moves. This effect is called "Ghost".

These scenes refer to the chorus' line: "Von der Skyline zum Bordstein zurück, siehst du unsere Welt, wie sie niemals still steht" ("From the skyline back to the curb, do you see our world, how it never stands still").

The video was shot in a supermarket, roll stairs, an underground car park garage and a pub. In the underground car park Bushido leans on a BMW 7. The video reached number 1 in the TRL Top 10. This brought him a golden tape.

Track listing 
Maxi Single CD1

References

Sources 
http://www.musicline.de/de/product/602517061903/Bushido/Von+Der+Skyline+Zum+Bordstein+Zur%25fcck/2388962/Maxi+Single+CD.html

2007 singles
Bushido (rapper) songs
2006 songs
German-language songs